Holcombe Ward defeated William Clothier in the all comers' final, 10–8, 6–4, 9–7 to win the men's singles tennis title at the 1904 U.S. National Championships. Reigning champion Laurence Doherty did not defend his title in the Challenge Round. The event was held at the Newport Casino in Newport, R.I., USA.

Draw

Challenge round

All Comers' finals

Earlier rounds

Section 1

Section 2

Section 3

Section 4

Section 5

Section 6

Section 7

Section 8

References
 

Men's Singles
1904